Zoe Samantha Lee (born 15 December 1985) is a British rower. She won a silver medal in the women's eight at the 2016 Olympic Games in Rio de Janeiro and a gold medal at the 2016 European Rowing Championships.

She read geography at the Hertford College, Oxford and completed her PhD in geography at King's College London in 2016.

References

External links 
 
 Zoe Lee at British Rowing
 
 
 

1985 births
Living people
Alumni of Hertford College, Oxford
Alumni of King's College London
English female rowers
Rowers at the 2016 Summer Olympics
Olympic rowers of Great Britain
Olympic silver medallists for Great Britain
Medalists at the 2016 Summer Olympics
Olympic medalists in rowing